In Cold Blood is a 1967 American neo-noir crime film written, produced and directed by Richard Brooks, based on Truman Capote's 1966 nonfiction book of the same name. It stars Robert Blake as Perry Smith and Scott Wilson as Richard "Dick" Hickock, two men who murder a family of four in Holcomb, Kansas. Although the film is in parts faithful to the book, Brooks made some slight alterations, including the inclusion of a fictional character, "The Reporter" (played by Paul Stewart).

The film was shot on location at sites where Smith and Hickock's crimes occurred, including the real Clutter home where they robbed and murdered all four members of the family. The film was nominated for four Academy Awards: Best Director, Best Original Score, Best Cinematography, and Best Adapted Screenplay. In 2008, it was selected for preservation in the United States National Film Registry by the Library of Congress as being "culturally, historically, or aesthetically significant".

Plot
Told through flashback, ex-convicts Perry Smith and "Dick" Hickock meet in rural Kansas in the fall of 1959. Together, they concoct a plan to invade the farm home of the wealthy Clutter family, as patriarch Herbert Clutter supposedly keeps a large supply of cash in a wall safe. The two criminals break into the home in the middle of the night but are unable to find any safe, as Herbert uses checks for his personal business and his farm operations. In order to leave no witnesses to their robbery attempt, Smith and Hickock kill Herbert by cutting his throat, and proceed to murder his wife, Bonnie, and their two teenage children, Nancy, 16, and Kenyon, 14, with a shotgun. Their bodies are discovered the next day, and a Finney County sheriff's and Kansas Bureau of Investigation (KBI) investigation is immediately launched, headed by detective Alvin Dewey.

Based on a tip by a former cell mate of Hickock, the two men become the primary suspects for the Clutter murders. The fugitives elude law enforcement by heading to Florida, traveling southwest across the country, and eventually crossing the Mexican border. After two weeks in Mexico, the two return to the United States, and decide to travel to Las Vegas, Nevada, hoping to earn money in gambling winnings. Shortly after their arrival to Las Vegas, Smith and Hickock are arrested for driving a stolen car, violating parole, and passing bad checks.

The Las Vegas Police Department and the KBI later separately interrogate the two men about the Clutter murders. Both Smith and Hickock admit to passing bad checks, but both deny knowing anything about the murders. The KBI attempts to scare the men into confessing, claiming that they left a witness behind who can testify against them. The KBI interrogation, however, is slowed by Smith's refusal to provide answers. Next, the KBI confront the two with evidence, such as a bloody footprint matching the boots worn by Smith. Finally, Hickock relents, confessing that he was present, but that Smith carried out the murders. He begs for immunity from the death penalty. After Smith learns that Hickock has confessed, he recounts how it was in fact he, not Hickock, who wielded the knife and pulled the trigger in all four killings, but maintains that Hickock was present as an active accomplice.

Both Smith and Hickock are charged with first-degree murder, found guilty on all counts, and each sentenced to death by hanging. After losing multiple appeals both men are hanged for their crimes with law enforcement officials and media representatives in attendance.

Cast

Production

Development
Brooks, an acquaintance of Truman Capote, was given early drafts of Capote's book In Cold Blood before it was completed, as Capote was considering optioning a film version. Otto Preminger had initially expressed interest in directing an adaptation, but Brooks agreed to the project and purchased the rights from Capote for an estimated $400,000.

Brooks's screenplay followed the structure of the book closely, shifting between Smith and Hickock and the Clutter family, though slight details were included that were not present in the source material. In his adaptation, Brooks intended to demonstrate the "indignity" of capital punishment through an exchange between Smith and a jail guard that occurs at the end of the film, in which Smith asks to use the bathroom before his execution, fearing he will "mess himself" in front of onlookers. Brooks held personal beliefs against the death penalty, and on the crimes, commented: "I think the crime without motive is really what this is about. The crime itself was senseless, the boys' lives before that were senseless, and the end is senseless because it solves nothing." Brooks also included a reporter character in the film who functions as a "Greek chorus" in the proceedings, which was not present in Capote's book. Capote would later admit he felt that the character's inclusion "didn't make sense". Brooks also eliminated discussion of two Clutter daughters who had not been present during the real attacks and had survived; they were allegedly "distraught" by the book and upset at the prospect of a film, so Brooks chose to eliminate them as characters.

Casting
Aspiring to recreate a documentary aesthetic for the film, Brooks deliberately cast actors who were relative unknowns. Columbia Pictures originally wanted Paul Newman and Steve McQueen as Richard Hickock and Perry Smith, respectively, but Brooks refused as he felt their star statuses would render their performances less believable to audiences. Around 500 contenders were considered for the roles. Robert Blake was ultimately cast as Smith in November 1966, and Scott Wilson was cast as Hickock in January 1967. Blake had been a child actor and appeared in numerous films prior, but was not well known as an adult. The film marked Wilson's second feature and first major role. Wilson was personally recommended for the part by Sidney Poitier and Quincy Jones (the former of whom he co-starred with in In the Heat of the Night, scored by Jones).

Filming
Principal photography of In Cold Blood occurred over 129 days in the spring of 1967. In accordance with Brooks's desire to achieve as much realism as possible, some scenes were filmed in Garden City and Holcomb, Kansas at the locations of the original events, including the Clutter family's farm where the murders took place. The family who owned the Clutter house were paid $15,000 in compensation for the crew's four weeks of filming.  The bus station scene was shot at the Union Bus Terminal at 917 McGee in Kansas City, MO.  Scenes were also shot in downtown Kansas City, KS on Minnesota Ave.  The shoot in Kansas was covered extensively by journalists from both Los Angeles and New York who visited the sets. Permission was denied to film in Kansas State Penitentiary, so interiors of the execution chambers were replicated on Hollywood sets. Leather straps for the execution scene were purchased from the penitentiary, as well as officers' uniforms. The actual latrines in Smith and Hickock's cells were also purchased by the production and implemented in the set.

Brooks's demeanor on set was noted as tempestuous by cast and crew members, with Wilson recalling that he was "focused [and] inspired" but "unpredictable...  a volcano who was going to erupt at some point". Wilson stated that he was frequently yelled at and at one point nearly walked off the set. Blake recalled Brooks's presence: "Sometimes Richard would flare up and get nuts and crazy and start screaming at people, and people thought that was because he was an asshole. It wasn't that, he was just frustrated. He didn't know how to get what he wanted. But when he sat alone at a typewriter, that was the best part for him."

In the scene where Blake's character discusses his father on the night of the execution, rain falls against the window of his prison cell. In rehearsals, cinematographer Conrad Hall noticed that the rain sliding down the glass was casting shadows on Blake's face, creating a visual effect that made it appear that Blake was crying. Hall pointed it out to Brooks and the blocking for Blake's character was changed so that the 'tears' would stay on his face throughout the scene. Hall, who was nominated for an Academy Award for his work on the film, called this effect "purely a visual accident".

Musical score

The score for the film was composed by Quincy Jones, who at the time had little experience with film scores. During the period, few black musicians were hired to compose scores for feature films, and Columbia Pictures initially pressed for Leonard Bernstein to compose the score, but Brooks insisted on Jones.

In preparing the score, Jones accompanied Brooks on a visit to the penitentiary in which Smith and Hickock were confined, and was inspired to utilize two acoustic basses throughout the score to represent the two killers' "demented minds". The score was completed throughout the shoot, with Jones writing new music to accompany dailies.

Personnel
 Orchestra arranged and conducted by Quincy Jones
 Gil Bernal − vocals (track 10)
 Buddy Childers − trumpet
 Frank Rosolino − trombone
 Dave Grusin − clavinet
 Gene Cipriano, Bud Shank, William Green − woodwinds
 Howard Roberts − guitar
 Ray Brown, Andy Simpkins − bass
 Carol Kaye − electric bass
 Shelly Manne, Earl Palmer − drums
 Don Elliott, Emil Richards − percussion

Reception

Box office
In Cold Blood premiered in the United States on December14, 1967, and grossed approximately $13million domestically. The film earned an additional $7,551 during a limited revival run in the United Kingdom in 2015.

At the time of its release, it was rated "For Mature Audiences", which meant no children under 17 were allowed to see the film without parents or legal guardians of age; now the MPAA has rated the film "R", due to its violence and mature nature.

Critical response
Bosley Crowther of The New York Times called the film an "excellent quasidocumentary, which sends shivers down the spine while moving the viewer to ponder". Roger Ebert gave the film 4 out of 4 stars, writing, "At times one feels this is not a movie but a documentary where the events are taking place now." Charles Champlin of The Los Angeles Times put it on his list of the ten best films of 1967, calling it "an honest, sobering, revealing motion picture, earnest and authentic, with only minor lapses into theatricality. As the killers, Scott Wilson and Robert Blake were compellingly convincing." Variety called it "a probing, sensitive, tasteful, balanced and suspenseful documentary-drama". Brendan Gill of The New Yorker wrote that "the note sounded throughout is not that of Hollywood but of a scrupulous documentary. This documentary effect is greatly enhanced by the two young men who play the murderers—Robert Blake as Perry Smith and Scott Wilson as Dick Hickock. Each in his own way is superbly mindless and menacing." The Monthly Film Bulletin was less positive, writing that "since Brooks places his emphasis so exclusively on the killers, omitting the spectacle of the actual murders while lingering censoriously over the hangings, one fails to appreciate the real irony—the total arbitrariness—of the Clutters' deaths: they are too crudely delineated to inspire much sympathy, and in consequence the sympathy Brooks generates for the killers seems unbalanced and misplaced".

On Rotten Tomatoes, In Cold Blood holds a rating of 83% from 41 reviews with an average rating of 8.3/10. The site’s consensus reads: "In Cold Blood is a classic docudrama with a fictional thriller's grip -- and a pair of terrific lead performances from Robert Blake and Scott Wilson".

Awards and nominations

American Film Institute Lists:
 AFI's 10 Top 10 - #8 Courtroom Drama

Critical analysis
In Cold Blood has been noted as an example of Hollywood new realism by critics such as Chris Fujiwara. Capote biographer Tison Pugh characterizes the film as an exercise in a "relentless pursuit of authenticity", and adds: "By putting his characters in the actual settings of their real-life counterparts, Brooks imbued his film with a reality both mundane and unbearable." Scholar Joel Black considers the film and its representation of real-life violent incidents "a form of psychological or social documentary".

Remake

A 1996 miniseries was also made based on the book, directed by Jonathan Kaplan and with a screenplay by Benedict Fitzgerald. In that adaptation, Anthony Edwards portrayed Dick Hickock, Eric Roberts played Perry Smith, and Sam Neill played Kansas Bureau of Investigation detective Alvin Dewey.

See also
 Clutter family murders
 List of American films of 1967
 Capote, a 2005 film about Capote's researching and writing of In Cold Blood.
 Infamous, a 2006 film covering the same time period in Capote's life.

References

Sources

External links

 
 
 
 
 In Cold Blood: Structuring the Real an essay by Chris Fujiwara at the Criterion Collection
 
In Cold Blood essay by Daniel Eagan in America's Film Legacy: The Authoritative Guide to the Landmark Movies in the National Film Registry, A&C Black, 2010 , pages 629-630 

1967 films
1967 crime drama films
American black-and-white films
American crime drama films
Columbia Pictures films
Crime films based on actual events
American docudrama films
Home invasions in film
1960s English-language films
Films scored by Quincy Jones
Films about capital punishment
Films based on non-fiction books
Films based on works by Truman Capote
Films directed by Richard Brooks
Films set in 1959
Films set in Kansas
Films set in the Las Vegas Valley
Films set in Mexico
Films shot in Kansas
Films shot in Nevada
United States National Film Registry films
1960s American films